Euskaltel–Euskadi was a professional road bicycle racing team from Spain, Europe.  The team was commercially sponsored, but was also partly funded by the Basque Government until the end of 2013, with riders either from the Basque Country, Navarre, La Rioja, and the French Basque Country, or who had grown up in the cycling culture of those regions: This policy was abandoned to enable retention of World Tour status. Its sponsor was Euskaltel, a Basque telecom company. Euskaltel–Euskadi was famous for its all-orange team kits. Whenever the Tour de France passed through the Basque Country many spectators lined the route dressed in the team's orange or the colours of the Basque flag.
The Euskaltel team also has a second team inside the "Fundacion Euskadi", this team rode in a continental category, the name of the team was Orbea. This team was created with the aim of forming the young cyclist before going to the Euskaltel–Euskadi.

History

Following the creation of the Euskadi Cycling Foundation (June 1993), Euskadi was established in 1994 (as Euskadi-Petronor), and has been recognizable among the peloton for their bright orange kit (which developed later in the team's history). After a financially turbulent first few seasons, in which the team was on the brink of folding multiple times, they secured their long term and most successful sponsor Euskaltel. By 1999, with Roberto Laiseka winning the team's first Grand Tour stage win this investment had paid off. In 2001 they were invited to the Tour de France and achieved another victory for Laiseka in the Pyrénées.

After a 2003 Tour de France breakthrough success during which both Iban Mayo and Haimar Zubeldia finished in the top-10 of the general classification, with Mayo winning the prized Alpe d'Huez stage.  Euskaltel–Euskadi was considered to be a strong contender for the 2004 Tour de France as well. Iban Mayo's commanding victory in the 2004 Critérium du Dauphiné Libéré stage race (traditionally seen as one of the tests for Tour de France contenders), including defeating Lance Armstrong in the Mont Ventoux hill climb individual time trial stage, further fueled the hype. Unfortunately, Mayo was injured in a crash on a pavé section of an early stage of the Tour de France, and abandoned in the first Pyrénées stage.  Zubeldia also failed to deliver in the 2004 Tour de France, to the chagrin of Basque fans lining the road. "I wish that our uniform was not so easy to spot," admitted directeur sportif Julián Gorospe.

In the 2005 season the team recruited Aitor González, who won the Tour de Suisse.  They again failed to make an impression in the 2005 Tour de France. In 2006 the sporting director Julián Gorospe was replaced by Igor González de Galdeano, who became technical secretary. Euskaltel–Euskadi ranked 13th in the UCI World Tour rankings among 18 teams, but only the top 15 teams automatically qualify for the World Tour for the following year (source?). The other teams qualify based on a variety of criteria, including team points and a dedication to clean racing, but the most important are points earned by individual riders.

Under points pressure, Euskaltel confirmed in 2012 that it would break with its long-standing policy of signing a majority of Basque riders and would employ riders of other countries to assure its UCI World Tour standing. This has had knock on effects for the makeup of other traditionally Basque teams such as Orbea and Caja Rural.

The withdrawal of sponsorship via government funds prompted the team to announce it would be unable to continue after the 2013 season. In September 2013 Formula One racing driver Fernando Alonso expressed a wish to ensure the team's survival by buying their UCI World Tour license but reached no agreement with the team.

In 2018 Mikel Landa, the President of the Euskadi Cycling Foundation, established Team Fundación Euskadi on the Continental tour. In 2020, Euskaltel revived its sponsorship, thereby rebranding the team with the name of its predecessor, Euskaltel-Euskadi.

Final team roster

Major wins

1995
 Stages 4 & 8 Volta ao Algarve, Asier Guenetxea

1996
 Memorial Manuel Galera, Iñaki Ayarzagüena
 Txitxarro Igoera, Iñaki Ayarzagüena
 Stage 4 Vuelta a Asturias, Álvaro González de Galdeano
  Time Trial Championship, Iñigo González de Heredia

1997
 Stage 4 Vuelta a los Valles Mineros, Igor González de Galdeano

1998
  Stage 8 Tour de l'Avenir, Txema Del Olmo Zendegi
  Stages 7 & 12 Volta a Portugal, Unai Etxebarria
  Clásica de Sabiñánigo, Igor González de Galdeano
  Stage 5 Volta a Galicia, Igor González de Galdeano

1999
 Stage 1 GP Mitsubishi, Aitor Silloniz
 Stage 4 GP Jornal de Noticias, José Alberto Martínez
 Stage 1 GP du Midi-Libre, José Alberto Martínez
 Stage 18 Vuelta a España, Roberto Laiseka

2000
 Overall, GP Jornal de Noticias, Mikel Artetxe Guezuraga
Stages 1 & 4 GP Jornal de Noticias, Mikel Artetxe Guezuraga
 Klasika Primavera, Unai Etxebarria
 Overall Tour de l'Avenir, Iker Flores
Stage 8, Aitor Kintana
Stage 9, Iker Flores
 Prologue Critérium du Dauphiné Libéré, Alberto Lopez de Munain Ruiz de Gauna
 Stage 1 Vuelta a Asturias, Alberto Lopez de Munain Ruiz de Gauna
 Stage 1 Vuelta a Burgos, José Alberto Martínez
 Overall Euskal Bizikleta, Haimar Zubeldia
Stage 4b, Haimar Zubeldia

2001
 Stage 5 Vuelta a Andalucía, Mikel Artetxe
 Stage 3 Volta a la Comunitat Valenciana, David Etxebarria
 Stage 3 Setmana Catalana de Ciclisme, Aitor Silloniz
 Stage 4 Tour of the Basque Country, Angel Castresana
 Stage 4 Vuelta a La Rioja, Igor Flores
 Stage 5 Vuelta a Asturias, Alberto López de Munain
 Overall GP du Midi-Libre, Iban Mayo
 Classique des Alpes, Iban Mayo
 Stage 3 Critérium du Dauphiné Libéré, Unai Etxebarria
 Stage 6 Critérium du Dauphiné Libéré, Iban Mayo
 Stage 14 Tour de France, Roberto Laiseka

2002
 Trofeo Manacor, Igor Flores
 Overall Critérium International, José Alberto Martínez
 Stages 5a & 5b Tour of the Basque Country, David Etxebarria
 Stage 1 Vuelta a Castilla y León, David Herrero
 Stage 4a Euskal Bizikleta, David Etxebarria
 Stage 5 Troféu Joaquim Agostinho, Mikel Artetxe
 Stage 7 Tour de l'Avenir, Aitor Silloniz

2003
 Overall Tour of the Basque Country, Iban Mayo
Stages 1, 5a & 5b Iban Mayo
 Stage 1 Vuelta a La Rioja, David Herrero
 Stage 1 Euskal Bizikleta, David Etxebarria
 Prologue & Stage 4 Critérium du Dauphiné Libéré, Iban Mayo
 Stage 1 Troféu Joaquim Agostinho, Lander Euba
 Stage 8 Tour de France, Iban Mayo
 Stage 5 Vuelta a Burgos, Gorka González
 Overall Tour de l'Avenir, Egoi Martínez

2004
 Trofeo Calvià, Unai Etxebarria
 Overall Clásica de Alcobendas, Iban Mayo
Stages 1 & 2, Iban Mayo
 Subida al Naranco, Iban Mayo
 GP Llodio, Unai Etxebarria
 Overall Vuelta a Asturias, Iban Mayo
 Stage 5 Euskal Bizikleta, Roberto Laiseka
 Overall Critérium du Dauphiné Libéré, Iban Mayo
Prologue & Stage 4, Iban Mayo

2005
 Stage 2 Clásica de Alcobendas, David Herrero
 GP Llodio, David Herrero
 Stage 4b Euskal Bizikleta, David Herrero
 Overall Critérium du Dauphiné Libéré, Iñigo Landaluze
 Overall Tour de Suisse, Aitor González
Stage 9, Aitor González
 Stage 5 Vuelta a Burgos, David Herrero
 Stage 11 Vuelta a España, Roberto Laiseka
 Stage 13 Vuelta a España, Samuel Sánchez
 Escalada a Montjuïc, Samuel Sánchez

2006
 Stages 2 & 3 Tour of the Basque Country, Samuel Sánchez
 Stage 5 Euskal Bizikleta, David Herrero
 Stage 6 Critérium du Dauphiné Libéré, Iban Mayo
 Stage 3 Vuelta a Asturias, Samuel Sánchez
 Overall Vuelta a Burgos, Iban Mayo
Stage 4, Iban Mayo
 Subida a Urkiola, Iban Mayo
 Stage 13 Vuelta a España, Samuel Sánchez
 Stage 16 Vuelta a España, Igor Antón
 Züri-Metzgete, Samuel Sánchez
 Escalada a Montjuïc, Igor Antón

2007
 Trofeo Calvià, Unai Etxebarria
 Stage 7 Tirreno–Adriatico, Koldo Fernández
 Stage 6 Tour of the Basque Country, Samuel Sánchez
 Stage 4 Tour de Romandie, Igor Antón
 Stage 7 Volta a Catalunya, Samuel Sánchez
 Stages 15, 19 & 20 Vuelta a España, Samuel Sánchez

2008
 Stage 5 Vuelta a Murcia, Koldo Fernández
 Stage 5 Vuelta a Castilla y León, Koldo Fernández
 Stage 2b Vuelta a Asturias, Samuel Sánchez
 Stage 2 Euskal Bizikleta, Koldo Fernández
 Stage 2 Tour de Suisse, Igor Antón
 Stage 3 Vuelta a Burgos, Koldo Fernández
 Tour de Vendée, Koldo Fernández

2009
 Stage 2 Volta ao Algarve, Koldo Fernández
 GP Llodio, Samuel Sánchez
 Circuito de Getxo, Koldo Fernández
 Subida a Urkiola, Igor Antón
 Stage 1 Vuelta a Burgos, Koldo Fernández

2010
 Stage 4 Tour of the Basque Country, Samuel Sánchez
 Klasika Primavera, Samuel Sánchez
 Stage 3 Vuelta a Castilla y León, Igor Antón
 Stage 1 Vuelta a Asturias, Pablo Urtasun
 Stage 3b Vuelta a Asturias, Beñat Intxausti
 Stage 5 Tour de Romandie, Igor Antón
 Stage 1 Bayern Rundfahrt, Rubén Pérez
 Stage 4 Tour de Luxembourg, Gorka Izagirre
 Prueba Villafranca de Ordizia, Gorka Izagirre
 Overall Vuelta a Burgos, Samuel Sánchez
Stage 1, Koldo Fernández
Stages 2 & 5, Samuel Sánchez
 Stages 4 & 11 Vuelta a España, Igor Antón
 Stage 16 Vuelta a España, Mikel Nieve
 Tour de Vendée, Koldo Fernández

2011
 GP Miguel Induráin, Samuel Sánchez
 Stage 4 Tour of the Basque Country, Samuel Sánchez
 Prologue Tour de Romandie, Jonathan Castroviejo
 Stage 1 Vuelta a la Comunidad de Madrid, Jonathan Castroviejo
 Stage 14 Giro d'Italia, Igor Antón
 Stage 15 Giro d'Italia, Mikel Nieve
 Stage 12 Tour de France, Samuel Sánchez
 Stage 1 Vuelta a Burgos, Samuel Sánchez
 Stage 5 Vuelta a Burgos, Mikel Landa
 Stage 19 Vuelta a España, Igor Antón

2012
 Stage 6 Volta a Catalunya, Samuel Sánchez
  Overall Tour of the Basque Country, Samuel Sánchez
Stages 3 & 6 (ITT), Samuel Sánchez
 Stage 2b (ITT) Vuelta a Asturias, Jon Izagirre
 Stage 16 Giro d'Italia, Jon Izagirre
 Prueba Villafranca de Ordizia, Gorka Izagirre
 Stage 7 Tour of Britain, Pablo Urtasun

2013
 Stage 1 Vuelta a Castilla y León, Pablo Urtasun
 Stage 2 Vuelta a Castilla y León, Juan José Lobato
 Stage 7 Critérium du Dauphiné, Samuel Sánchez
  Time Trial Championships, Ioannis Tamouridis
  Road Race Championships, Ioannis Tamouridis
 Circuito de Getxo, Juan José Lobato

See also
List of cycling teams in Spain
Orbea (cycling team)

Athletic Bilbao, football club with a  similar Basque player hiring policy

References

External links

 
 UCI Team profile

Defunct cycling teams based in Spain
Cycle racing in the Basque Country (autonomous community)
Cycling teams established in 1994
Cycling teams disestablished in 2013
Former UCI WorldTeams